Superjet Lines (formally Arab Union for Land Transport Company) or is a large common carrier of passengers by bus in Egypt and a number of Arab countries. The main station in Cairo is in Almaza, Heliopolis, close to Cairo Airport.

Gallery

See also 
 Transport in Egypt
 Economy of Egypt

References

External links 

 Official website

Bus operating companies
Transport companies of Egypt
Government-owned companies of Egypt